Write or Dance is a 2016 South Korean drama film directed by Lee Sang-deok.

Plot
The story of an aspiring novelist who experiences special meetings with different individuals, on a particular day of every month.

Cast
Choi Si-hyung as Si-hyung
Jeon Yeo-been as Yeo-been
Chae Seo-jin as Go-un
Yozoh as Su-jin
Yoo I-deun as I-deun
Jeon So-nee as So-ni

References

External links

2016 films
South Korean drama films
2010s South Korean films